Sead is masculine Bosnian given name equivalent to the Arabic masculine given name Sa'id.

Notable people with the name include:

Sead Babača (born 1981), Montenegrin football midfielder
Sead Banda (born 1990), Montenegrin professional football striker
Sead Bajramović (born 1973), Serbian professional football player
Sead Brunčević (born 1977), Serbian Bosniak retired football player
Sead Bučan (born 1981), Bosnian-Herzegovinian footballer
Sead Čaušević (born 1949), Bosnian politician
Sead Čelebić (born 1956), Bosnian football midfielder
Sead Gorani (born 1977), Kosovar footballer
Sead Hadžibulić (born 1983), Serbian football
Sead Hajrović (born 1993), Bosnian-Herzegovinian professional footballer
Sead Hakšabanović (born 1999), Swedish-born Montenegrin footballer
Sead Halilagić (born 1972), Serbian-born Bosniak former footballer
Sead Hasanefendić (born 1948), Bosnian handball coach
Sead Kajtaz (born 1963), Bosnian-Herzegovinian footballer
Sead Kalač (born 1964), pop-folk singer popular in the former Yugoslavia
Sead Kapetanović (born 1972), Bosnian-Herzegovinian footballer
Sead Kolašinac (born 1993), Bosnian-Herzegovinian professional footballer
Sead Lipovača (born 1955), Bosnian guitarist
Sead Mašić (born 1959), Bosnian-Herzegovinian footballer
Sead Mehić (born 1975), Bosnian-Herzegovinian former footballer
Sead Muratović (born 1979), Serbian footballer
Sead Ramović (born 1979), Bosnian-Herzegovinian football goalkeeper
Sead Salahović (born 1977), Serbian professional football player
Sead Sarajlić (born 1987), Bosnian-Herzegovinian football player
Sead Seferović (born 1980), Bosnian-Herzegovinian footballer
Sead Sušić (born 1953), Bosnian-Herzegovinian professional footballer
Sead Šehović (born 1989), Montenegrin professional basketball player
Sead Zilić (born 1982), Serbian-born Bosnian-Herzegovinian football player
Sead Župić (born 1994), Serbian football midfielder

See also
Sejad
 Sead (disambiguation)

Bosnian masculine given names